Marian Vătavu (born 20 May 1982) is a Romanian former professional footballer who played as a centre back for teams such as Dinamo București, FCM Câmpina, Unirea Urziceni, CS Otopeni or Chindia Târgovişte, among others.

Club career

Dinamo București

Being a youth product of the Dinamo București, Vătavu enjoyed brief windows of playing time at the Bucharest squad, usually being loaned to Liga II clubs like FCM Câmpina, Farul Constanţa or Universitatea Cluj.

After he left Dinamo, he usually had brief spells at Unirea Urziceni, Pandurii Târgu Jiu, CSM Râmnicu Vâlcea and CS Otopeni.

Politehnica Iași

In the summer of 2011 he joined Liga II side Politehnica Iași. He was released half a year later.

Honours
Dinamo București
Liga I: 1999–2000
Liga I: 2001–02

Chindia Târgoviște
Liga III: 2014–15
Liga II: 2018–19

References

External links
 
 

1982 births
Living people
Sportspeople from Târgoviște
Romanian footballers
Association football defenders
Liga I players
Liga II players
FC Dinamo București players
FCM Câmpina players
FCV Farul Constanța players
FC Universitatea Cluj players
FC Unirea Urziceni players
CS Pandurii Târgu Jiu players
SCM Râmnicu Vâlcea players
CS Otopeni players
FC Politehnica Iași (2010) players
AFC Chindia Târgoviște players